Sa Re Ga Ma Pa Mega Challenge was a special installment of the popular Indian Sa Re Ga Ma Pa vocal contest shown on Zee TV. This show was a seven-week-long competition among eight teams representing eight different states and consisting of total 24 talented contestants from past seasons of Sa Re Ga Ma Pa.  Two teams were competing against each other each week starting 30 October 2009, to head towards the finales. The show was made to celebrate the 1000th episode of Sa Re Ga Ma Pa, and the Grand Finale on 12 Dec 2009 marked the 1000th episode of this great singing competition - a historic moment for any show on Indian television. Notable Indian singers and musicians were selected for each of the episodes to make the decisions as the judges.

The final was between West Bengal Abhijit Ghoshal, Keka Ghoshal and Sanchita Bhattacharya) and Maharashtra (Vaishali Made, Kaushik Deshpande and Rohit Raut) where the latter team was declared as a winner. Sonu Nigam, Suresh Wadkar and Pyarelal were seen as the panel of judges for the grand night.

Judges
The judges are:

 30 & 31 October - Asha Bhonsle
 6 & 7 November - Sadhana Sargam and Pritam
 13 & 14 November - Suresh Wadkar and Alka Yagnik
 20 & 21 November - Salim–Sulaiman and Pyarelal
 27 & 28 November - Abhijeet Bhattacharya, Bappi Lahiri and Kavita Krishnamurthy
 4 & 5 December - Kumar Sanu and Udit Narayan
 11 December    - Jatin Pandit, Anand, Daler Mehndi
 12 December(1000th episode)   -  Sonu Nigam, Pyarelal and Suresh Wadkar

Hosts
The hosts of Mega Challenge are:
 Vipul Roy and Manish Paul
 Karan Singh Rathore and Archana Jani (only for the first week of 30-31 Oct)

Karan Singh and Archana Jani are Radio hosts, called "Radio Jockey" or "RJ" in India. They presented impressive Hindi voices in this show, but may have fallen short on expectations of TV audience.

Contestants
The contestants/captains who participate in this show are:

Teams
Assam:
 Captain: Joy Chakraborty
 Anamika Choudhari
 Abhigyan Das

Gujarat:
 Captain: Parthiv Gohil
 Deepali Somaiya
 Prachi Shah

West Bengal:
 Captain: Abhijit Ghoshal Runner up of Mega Challenge
 Keka Ghoshal
 Sanchita Bhattacharya

Madhya Pradesh:
 Captain: Sumedha Karmahe
 Amir Hafiz
 Pratibha Singh Baghel

Maharashtra:
 Captain: Vaishali Mhade Winner of Mega challenge! 1000 episode winner!
 Kaushik Deshpande
 Rohit Raut

Punjab:
 Captain: Tarun Sagar
 Harpreet Deol
 Rohanpreet Singh

Rajasthan:
 Captain: Raja Hassan
 Dilshad Ali
 Priyanka Maliya

Uttar Pradesh:
 Captain: Twinkle Bajpai
 Hemant Brijwasi
 Poonam Yadav

Versus
 30 & 31 October - Maharashtra vs. Uttar Pradesh
 6 & 7 November - Madhya Pradesh vs. Gujarat
 13 & 14 November - Assam vs. Rajasthan
 20 & 21 November - West Bengal vs. Punjab
 27 & 29 November - Gujarat vs. Maharashtra
 4 & 5 December - West Bengal vs. Assam
 11 & 12 December - Maharashtra vs. West Bengal

Points
        *Maharashtra  vs. Uttar Pradesh
                     *Friday
Group Song 1     6       *Group Song 1   6
Duet Song 2     10      *Duet Song 2   7
Duet Song 3     6       *Duet Song 3   6
      Total           22       *    Total           19

      *Maharashtra  vs. Uttar Pradesh
                    *Saturday
Vaishali Made      10      *Twinkle Bajpai       8
Kaushik Deshpande  8       *Hemant Brijwasi       9
Rohit Raut         8       *Poonam Yadav         7
        Total            48                      Total          43
Winner Maharashtra pass to the Semifinal!

               *Gujarat   vs.  Madhya Pradesh
                         *Friday
Group Song 1         7            *Group Song 1     8.5
Duet Song 2         9            *Duet Song 2     7.5
Duet Song 3         8            *Duet Song 3     6.5
Jungalbandi          5            *Jungalbandi       5
      Total               29              *    Total             27.5
                 *Gujarat     vs.     Madhya Pradesh
                           *Saturday
Parthiv Gohil              9                *Sumedha Karmahe       8
Deepali Somaiya            7                *Amir Hafiz           9.5
Prachi Shah                8                *Pratibha Singh Baghel 8
Jugalbandi                 6                *Jugalbandi            4
     Total                      59                  *    Total                  57
Winner Gujarat pass to the Semifinal!
                   *Rajasthan     vs.        Assam
                               *Friday
Group Song 1          7                    *Group Song 1     8
Duet Song 2          8                    *Duet Song 2     9
Duet Song 3          8                    *Duet Song 3    9.5
Jugalbandi            5                    *Jugalbandi       5
      Total                28                      *      Total          31.5
                   *Rajasthan     vs.        Assam
                              *Saturday
Raja Hassan           10                   *Joy Chakraborty      8
Dilshad Ali           9                    *Anamika Choudhari  9.5
Priyanka Maliya      7.5                   *Abhigyan Das         9
Jugalbandi            6                    *Jugalbandi           4
      Total               60.5                     *       Total              62
Winner Assam pass to the Semifinal!
                      *West Bengal    vs.           Punjab
                                   *Friday
Group Song 1                 7              *Group Song 1            5
Duet Song 2                 7              *Duet Song 2            7
Duet Song 3                 5              *Duet Song 3            7
Jugalbandi                   5              *Jugalbandi              4
       Total                      24                *       Total                 23
                      *West Bengal    vs.           Punjab
                                   *Saturday
Abhijit Ghoshal              8               *Tarun Sagar             9
Keka Ghoshal                 8               *Harpreet Deol           4
Sanchita Bhattacharya        7               *Rohanpreet Singh        7
Jugalbandi                   5               *Jugalbandi              5
       Total                      52                 *        Total                48
Winner West Bengal pass to the Semifinal!
                                 *1st Semifinal
                        *Maharashtra       vs.       Gujarat
                                            *Friday
Duet Song 1                     7            *Duet Song 1               8
Vaishali Made                    8            *Parthiv Gohil              8
Kaushik Deshpande                8            *Deepali Somaiya            6
Rohit Raut                       8            *Prachi Shah                9
     Total                            31              *         Total                  31
                        *Maharashtra       vs.             Gujarat
                                        *Saturday
Duet Song 1                     8            *Duet Song 1               6.5
Vaishali Made                   10            *Parthiv Gohil              8.5
Kaushik Deshpande                8            *Deepali Somaiya             7
Rohit Raut                      7.5           *Prachi Shah                7.5
Jugalbandi                       5            *Jugalbandi                  5
    Total                            69.5             *        Total                   64.5
Winner Maharashtra and is the Mega Finalist of Sa Re Ga Ma Pa Mega Challenge!
                                      2nd Semifinal
                        *West Bengal            vs.              Assam
                                              Friday
Duet Song 1                10                  *Duet Song 1        8
Abhijit Ghoshal             8                  *Joy Chakraborty    9
Keka Ghoshal                9                  *Anamika Choudhari 10
Sanchita Bhattacharya      10                  *Abhigyan Das       10
      Total                      37                    *        Total            37
                        *West Bengal             vs.              Assam
                                               Saturday
Duet Song 1                 9                  *Duet Song 1         9
Abhijit Ghoshal            10                  *Joy Chakraborty    9.5
Keka Ghoshal               10                  *Anamika Choudhari  10
Sanchita Bhattacharya      10                  *Abhigyan Das        10
Jugalbandi                  5                  *Jugalbandi           5
      Total                      81                    *      Total              80.5

THE FINALS

The final was between West Bengal (Abhijit Ghoshal, Keka Ghoshal and Sanchita Bhattacharya) and Maharashtra (Vaishali Made, Kaushik Deshpande and Rohit Raut) where the latter team was declared as a winner. Sonu Nigam, Suresh Wadkar and Pyrelal were seen as the panel of judges for the grand night.

Eliminations
Here are the eliminations so far:

 Episode 2 - Uttar Pradesh: Twinkle Bajpai
 Episode 4 - Madhya Pradesh: Sumedha Karmahe
 Episode 6 - Rajasthan: Raja Hasan
 Episode 8 - Punjab: Tarun Sagar
 Episode 10 - Gujarat: Parthiv Gohil
 Episode 12 - Assam: Joy Chakraborty
 Episode 14 - West Bengal: Abijit Ghoshal

References

Sa Re Ga Ma Pa